Gerald J. Tubbs (January 23, 1935 – June 13, 2012) was an American football linebacker who played for ten seasons in the National Football League from 1957 to 1966, mainly for the Dallas Cowboys.  He was selected by the Dallas Cowboys in the 1960 NFL Expansion Draft.  After his retirement he stayed with the Cowboys as an assistant coach for 22 years. He played college football at the University of Oklahoma. In 1996, he was inducted into the College Football Hall of Fame.

High school career
Tubbs was an honor graduate student and played center at Breckenridge High School. The teams were coached by Cooper Robbins (1951) and Joe Kerbel (1952), who would go on to the college ranks. Tubbs lost only three games during his high school career. In 1971, he was inducted into the Texas High School Football Hall of Fame. Since 2008, the Breckenridge Buckaroos open the football season playing the "Jerry Tubbs Kickoff Classic".

College career
Tubbs played three varsity years at the University of Oklahoma, and the Sooners won all 31 games in that period. In 1954, when fullback Billy Pricer was injured, Tubbs had to replace him playing against University of Texas, the first time he had ever played in the backfield. In the remaining games of that season, he averaged 6.1 yards per carry. Head coach Bud Wilkinson moved him to center in 1955, and this became his signature position. He also played linebacker and in a victory over Texas in 1955, he intercepted three passes. In 1956, he was unanimous All-America center and was named Lineman of the Year by three agencies.

During his three varsity years, Oklahoma's record was 10-0, 11-0, 10-0. His 31 wins were part of that legendary 47-game winning streak and two national titles from 1954-56. The 1954 team was ranked third nationally in the Associated Press and United Press polls. The 1955 and 1956 teams were national champions. In those years Oklahoma played in only one bowl game, where the 1955 team beat Maryland University 20-6 in the Orange Bowl.

Tubbs finished fourth in the 1956 Heisman Trophy voting (very high for a lineman), behind his third place teammate, Tommy McDonald, and winner Paul Hornung of Notre Dame University. He graduated from Oklahoma with a degree in economics and was also a 1956 Academic All-America.

In 1996, he was inducted into the College Football Hall of Fame and in 1999 he was inducted into the Oklahoma Sports Hall of Fame.

Professional career

Chicago Cardinals
He was drafted by the Chicago Cardinals in the first round of the 1957 NFL Draft — 10th overall. Suddenly, he found himself on a perennial loser, playing out of position as an outside linebacker. He was eventually benched, and then traded to the San Francisco 49ers after the seventh game of the 1958 season.

San Francisco 49ers
The following year (1959), the San Francisco 49ers moved him into the middle linebacker position, where he became a starter. After the 1959 season, Tubbs planned to retire, so the 49ers left him off their list of players who were exempt from the 1960 NFL Expansion Draft.

Dallas Cowboys
Tubbs was acquired by the Dallas Cowboys in 1960 NFL Expansion Draft. As it turned out, he would spend the next 29 years in Dallas — as a player, player-coach and full-time assistant coach.  In the 4th game of the 1960 season, Tubbs became the first player in franchise history to start at the middle linebacker position on a regular basis, finishing with 149 tackles (48 solo).

Tubbs was an impact player on those early Cowboys teams and also rated among the top middle linebackers in the NFL. He had quickness, toughness and an unbeatable motor. In 1962, he was one of the first Cowboys players voted to the Pro Bowl, along with: QB Eddie LeBaron; DT Bob Lilly; RB Don Perkins; and CB Don Bishop.

He became a player-coach in 1965. In 1966 he retired and was working for the Dallas Federal Savings and Loan Association, but was lured back by Tom Landry to play behind Lee Roy Jordan for one more year. He played just the first three games of the season, until he suffered a back injury.

The following year (1967), Landry sensing that the Cowboys had a real chance at a championship, wanted to have Tubbs as insurance in the event Lee Roy Jordan should be injured. He came back again, but didn't play a single down while serving as a player-coach, hence he was on the roster and in uniform for the 1967 Ice Bowl championship game against the Packers.

Personal life
When he finally retired as a player at the end of the 1967 season, he became Cowboys linebackers coach for 21 years. He coached in five Super Bowls, winning two of them. He died on June 13, 2012 at the age of 77.

References

External links
 Accidental Treasure
 
 Oklahoma Sports Hall of Fame bio
 University of Oklahoma bio
 First win for Cowboys was a memorable one
 

1935 births
2012 deaths
All-American college football players
Chicago Cardinals players
San Francisco 49ers players
Dallas Cowboys players
Eastern Conference Pro Bowl players
Oklahoma Sooners football players
College Football Hall of Fame inductees
Dallas Cowboys coaches
People from Throckmorton County, Texas